Amanita viscidolutea is a species of agaric fungus in the family Amanitaceae native to Brazil, first described by Menolli, Capelari & Baseia in 2009. It is listed as a vulnerable species on IUCN Red List.

Description 
Amanita viscidolutea has a yellow pileus of 40–60 mm diam, plane to depressed, with distinct striate white margin and yellowish-white patches of universal veil at center. Lamellae are free, yellowish-white, truncate to rounded-truncate. Stipe (80–120 38–9 mm), is yellowish-white and exannulate, with bulb-shaped remnants of universal veil encircling stipe base. It has a pleasant aroma. Basidiospores are inamyloid

This species is solitary to subgregarious, and grows in sandy soil. It is associated and thus possibly in mycorrhizal symbiosis with Coccoloba and Guapira species, and is threeatened by deforestation.

External links

References 

viscidolutea
Fungi of Brazil
Fungi described in 2009